Richard Moran is an American philosopher. He is Brian D. Young Professor of Philosophy at Harvard University, where he specializes in philosophy of mind, moral psychology and philosophy of art.

Education and career

Moran received an AB from Dartmouth College in 1977 and a PhD from Cornell University in 1989, the latter under the supervision of Sydney Shoemaker. He joined the faculty at Princeton University as an assistant professor that same year.  He accepted a tenured offer to teach in the Department of Philosophy at Harvard University in Fall 1995.

Philosophical work

Moran has written several books including Authority and Estrangement: An Essay on Self-Knowledge (2001), The Philosophical Imagination (2017), and The Exchange of Words: Speech, Testimony, and Intersubjectivity (2018).

References

External links

'3:16' Interview with Richard Marshall

American philosophers
Harvard University faculty
Living people
Cornell University alumni
Philosophers of mind
Philosophers of art
Year of birth missing (living people)